The Tränenpalast is a former border crossing point between East and West Berlin, at Berlin Friedrichstraße station, which was in operation between 1962 and 1989. It is now a museum with exhibitions about Berlin during the Cold War period and about the process of German reunification. It was the border crossing for travellers on the S-bahn, U-bahn and trains going between East and West Germany. It was used only for westbound border crossings. It had separate checkpoints for West Berliners, West Germans, foreigners, diplomats, transit travellers and East Germans.

The term Tränenpalast is derived from the tearful partings that took place in front of the building between western visitors and East German residents who were not permitted to travel to West Berlin.

Border station during the time of the Berlin Wall 

Although Berlin Friedrichstraße station was located entirely in East Berlin, because of the Berlin Wall some S-bahn and U-bahn lines were accessible only from West Berlin. Travellers in West Berlin could use the station to transfer between those lines, or to cross into East Germany. The Tränenpalast was built after the volume of traffic and the constraints of the lower level of the main building made it necessary to expand.

After the fall of the Berlin Wall 
After the fall of the Berlin Wall, the building was used as a nightclub and stage until 2006. It was listed as a protected historic monument on 2 October 1990 by the GDR government, a day before German reunification, which was on 3 October 1990.

Museum
In 2008 the Tränenpalast became a federal memorial site. On 15 September 2011, the Haus der Geschichte opened the museum with  exhibitions about Berlin during the Cold War. It displays original artefacts, documents, photographs and audio-visual material about the checkpoint and it provides an overview of the German reunification process.

It was opened by German Chancellor Angela Merkel on 14 September 2011. In its first two weeks more than 30,000 people visited the museum. Entrance is free.

Gallery

During the Cold War

During the Fall of the Berlin Wall

Post German Reunification

See also 
 DDR Museum
 Haus am Checkpoint Charlie
 Haus der Geschichte
 Museum in the Kulturbrauerei
 Stasi Museum
 Zeitgeschichtliches Forum Leipzig

References

External links

 Tränenpalast Museum

Buildings and structures in Berlin
Berlin Wall
Berlin border crossings
Allied occupation of Germany
Museums in Berlin
Cold War museums in Germany
Buildings and structures in Mitte